Matamala is a surname. Notable people with the surname include:

Jordi Matamala (born 1976), Spanish professional footballer
Néstor Matamala, Chilean football manager
Llorenç Matamala i Piñol (1856–1925), Spanish Catalan sculptor

See also
Matamala de Almazán, municipality located in the province of Soria, Castile and León, Spain
Mamala
Matala (disambiguation)
Tamala (disambiguation)